The International Day of United Nations Peacekeepers, May 29, is "an international day to pay tribute to all the men and women who have served and continue to serve in United Nations peacekeeping operations for their high level of professionalism, dedication, and courage and to honor the memory of those who have lost their lives in the cause of peace."

Creation
It was so designated by United Nations General Assembly Resolution 57/129, on December 11, 2002, after an official request of the Ukrainian Peacekeepers Association and the Government of Ukraine to the UN General Assembly and first celebrated in 2003. The date, May 29, marks the anniversary of the creation of the United Nations Truce Supervision Organization (UNTSO) in 1948 to monitor the ceasefire after the 1948 Arab-Israeli War, which was the first ever UN peacekeeping mission.

Commemoration
The day is marked at the United Nations Headquarters in New York City with the presentation of the Dag Hammarskjöld Medal, statements by the President of the General Assembly and the Secretary-General, as well as a press release regarding the state of UN Peacekeeping missions and the continued necessity of their work.

There are also observances around the world; often countries will honor their own peacekeepers abroad, but the UN also organizes festivals, discussion forums, and memorials in cooperation with local and national groups.

In 2009, the UN put a special focus on the role of and need for women in peacekeeping, both as role models and also to serve in a number of gender-specific capacities.

National Peacekeepers' Day is commemorated in Canada on 9 August in memory of the loss of life when a Canadian-operated white UN marked passenger airplane was shot down by Syria.

References/Notes

See also

Attacks on humanitarian workers
International Day of Peace
Veterans Day (Sweden)

External links
 UN peacekeeping website
 Canadian Association of Veterans in United Nations Peacekeeping
 Official UNDOF Website
 Official Austrian Army Website – UNDOF (German)
 Austrian Army – UNDOF (Wikipedia-German)
UNIKOM

May observances
Remembrance days
United Nations peacekeeping
United Nations days
Veterans days